Marvel Anime is a series of four anime superhero television series and two direct-to-video films produced in collaboration between Marvel Entertainment, Japanese animation studio Madhouse, and Sony Pictures Entertainment Japan. The four twelve-episode series, based on Iron Man, Wolverine, X-Men, and Blade, aired in Japan on Animax between October 2010 and September 2011. An English-language version aired in North America on G4 between July 2011 and April 2012. Each of the series, guided by writer Warren Ellis, largely features Japan as the setting for the storyline.

Premise

The project reimagined top Marvel characters for a Japanese audience via four 12-part series; Iron Man, Wolverine, X-Men, and Blade, which aired in Japan on Animax between October 2010 and September 2011. The announcement was confirmed at the 2009 San Diego Comic-Con. According to former Madhouse President and CEO Jungo Maruta, Marvel gave the anime studio free rein to re-imagine the Marvel superheroes for Japanese audiences. The English version would premiere in the United States on G4. The series was guided by Warren Ellis. "It will create an entire parallel universe for Marvel," said Simon Philips, president of Marvel International about Marvel Anime. The Marvel Anime series aired in Australia on Sci Fi.

Wolverine appears in all four of the anime, being a guest star in Iron Man and Blade, with each appearance taking place either before and after his anime.

Iron Man

 (DVD title: Iron Man: Animated Series; spelled IRONMAN on-screen) is the first show of the series with 12 episodes. The series was directed by Yuzo Sato, with Warren Ellis writing the story and Jamie Simone serving as voice director, casting director, and reversion producer for the English version. A special preview ran on Animax on September 25, 2010, before the series began airing on October 1, 2010, and ended on December 17, 2010. While Iron Man premiered in the US on G4 on July 29, 2011, a "sneak peek" of the first episode aired on July 23, 2011 following G4's Comic-Con 2011 Live coverage. The entire series was released on DVD in the United States on April 24, 2012. It was also released on Blu-ray in Japan on June 22, 2011. A follow up direct-to-video film called Iron Man: Rise of Technovore was released on April 16, 2013.

Plot
Tony Stark goes to Japan to produce a new arc reactor power station and showcase the Iron Man Dio, a new prototype armor, that will replace him when he retires. However, the Iron Man Dio goes berserk and it is up to Tony as Iron Man to stop it along with an organization called the Zodiac. Iron Man even gains an ally in JSDF operative Captain Nagato Sakurai piloting the Ramon Zero armor that his military group made for him. Iron Man soon discovers that his old friend Ho Yinsen (who Tony thought was dead upon his first time as Iron Man) is alive and is operating the Iron Man Dio armor for the Zodiac's goals.

Cast

Wolverine

 is the second show of the series with 12 episodes. It aired on Animax between January 7, 2011 and March 25, 2011. While Wolverine premiered in the US on G4 on July 29, 2011, a "sneak peek" of the first episode aired on July 23, 2011 following the Iron Man "sneak peek" and G4's Comic-Con 2011 Live coverage. Jamie Simone served as voice director, casting director, and reversion producer for the English version. The entire series was released on DVD in the United States on July 31, 2012. It was also released on Blu-ray in Japan on June 22, 2011.

Plot
Logan learns that his true love, beloved sweetheart and girlfriend Mariko Yashida, who disappeared one year ago, has been taken to Tokyo by her father Shingen Yashida, the head of the Japanese crime syndicate Kuzuryu and a supplier of A.I.M., in order to be wed to Hideki Kurohagi. Wolverine goes on a quest to rescue Mariko and defeat Shingen and Hideki, encountering several opponents along the way.

Cast

X-Men

 (DVD title: X-Men: Animated Series) scheduled to air as the third show of the series with 12 episodes. It aired on Animax from April 1, 2011, to June 24, 2011. A preview trailer was released on February 18, 2011, featuring mutants and some from the 20th Century Fox  X-Men franchise such as Cyclops, Wolverine, Storm, Professor X and Beast. It premiered in the United States on G4 on October 21, 2011. Jamie Simone as voice director, casting director, and reversion producer for the English version. The entire series was released on DVD in the United States on April 24, 2012. It was also released on Blu-ray in Japan on December 7, 2011.

Plot
Following the death of Jean Grey (who was being controlled by the Dark Phoenix, due to the sinister influence of the Inner Circle), the X-Men are reassembled by Professor X to travel to Japan following the abduction of Armor and face the U-Men who are abducting young mutants in order to harvest their organs. During their fight with the U-Men, the X-Men discover that some of the mutants in Japan are suffering from the "Damon Hall Syndrome" which causes problems for mutants during their second mutation. The X-Men must also deal with the next plot of the Inner Circle.

Cast

Blade

 is the fourth and final show of the series. Comprising twelve episodes like the others, the story is written by Kenta Fukasaku, son of the late Kinji Fukasaku. Jamie Simone served as casting director, reversion producer, and voice director for the English version where he was assisted by Mary Elizabeth McGlynn. It aired on Animax from July 1, 2011, to September 16, 2011. The entire series was released on DVD in the United States on July 31, 2012. It was also released on Blu-ray in Japan on February 22, 2012.

Plot
Blade is a "daywalker" vampire hunter who was born with human and vampire blood in his veins after a vampire attacked his mother. Blade is visiting Japan on a mission where he not only confronts Deacon Frost (the vampire who killed his mother Tara Brooks), but also goes up against a mysterious organization of vampires known as "Existence."

Cast

Films
Following the TV series, Madhouse animated different Marvel Anime films.

 The first was Iron Man: Rise of Technovore, a direct-to-video film directed by Hiroshi Hamasaki, which was released on April 16, 2013 in the United States.
 The second was Avengers Confidential: Black Widow & Punisher which was released on March 25, 2014 in the United States.

Other Marvel anime projects
Other anime television series based on Marvel characters have also been produced.

Marvel Disk Wars: The Avengers

Marvel Disk Wars: The Avengers is a 2014 anime series produced by Walt Disney Japan and Toei Animation. It follows five children that each gain the ability to summon a specific member of Avengers, who have been trapped in small devices called DISKs, as they travel the world to help the Avengers retrieve other superheroes' and supervillains' DISKs before they are used for evil. The series aired on TX Network and ran for 51 episodes.

Marvel Future Avengers

Marvel Future Avengers is a 2017 anime series produced by Madhouse and Walt Disney Japan. It follows three children who are rescued from Hydra by the Avengers and trained to become superheroes. The series aired for 39 episodes on the Dlife satellite channel, and was released internationally via Disney+ in 2020.

See also

 Marvel Mangaverse
 Spider-Man: The Manga
 X-Men: The Manga
 Hulk: The Manga
 Del Rey Manga/Marvel
 Marvel × Shōnen Jump+ Super Collaboration

References

External links
  
 
 
 
 
 Marvel Anime at Internet Movie Database
 
 
 
 

2010 anime television series debuts
2010 Japanese television series debuts
2010 Japanese television series endings
2011 Japanese television series debuts
2011 Japanese television series endings
Japanese television series based on American television series
Superheroes in anime and manga
Anime based on comics
Iron Man television series
Madhouse (company)
Marvel Entertainment franchises
Madhouse (company) franchises
Animated television shows based on Marvel Comics
X-Men television series
Wolverine (comics) in other media
Television series by Sony Pictures Television
Works by Len Wein
Japan Self-Defense Forces in fiction
Yakuza in anime and manga